Zinc finger protein 839 is a protein that in humans is encoded by the ZNF839 gene.

References

Further reading 

Molecular biology
Proteins
Proteomics